Ambleside is a town and former civil parish, now in the parish of Lakes, in Cumbria, in North West England.
Historically in Westmorland, it marks the head (and sits on the east side of the northern headwater) of Windermere, England's largest natural lake. In the Lake District National Park, it is south of the highest road pass in the Lake District, Kirkstone Pass and both places are the meeting point of well-marked paths and mountain hiking trails. In 2020 it had an estimated population of 2596. In 1961 the parish had a population of 2562.

Economy

Local government services
Ambleside is co-administered by South Lakeland District Council and in minor matters forms part of the Lakes civil parish. The other main co-administration is Cumbria County Council. Ambleside was formerly a township, in 1866 Ambleside became a civil parish in its own right until it was abolished on 1 April 1974 to form Lakes.

From 1894 to 1935, Ambleside formed its own urban district.

Tourist amenities
"Steamers" are the throwback name for the ferries (diesel-propelled) which run most days to Bowness-on-Windermere and Lakeside offering fine views of the lake and the mountains – see Waterhead locality below.

Ambleside is a base for hiking, mountaineering and mountain biking. It has several hotels, guest houses, restaurants and shops. Specialist shops sell equipment, guides and give recommendations to walkers, backpackers and climbers. Ambleside is a popular starting point for the Fairfield horseshoe, a hillwalking ridge hike.

A concentration of ten pubs or bars within a quarter-mile radius reflects how the local hospitality market serves residents, tourists, visitors and the student population associated with the University of Cumbria.

History
The town's name is derived from the Old Norse "Á-mel-sǽtr" which literally translates as "river – sandbank – summer pasture".

To the south of Ambleside is the Roman fort of Galava, dating from AD 79.

In 1650 the town was granted a charter to hold a market. In the reign of James II, another charter was granted for the town to collect tolls. The town's Market Place became the commercial centre for agriculture and the wool trade. The old packhorse trail between Ambleside and Grasmere was the main route between the two towns before the new turnpike road was completed in 1770. Smithy Brow at the end of the trail was where pack ponies were re-shod after their journey. With the coming of the turnpikes, the packhorse trains were superseded by horse-drawn stagecoaches, which regularly travelled between Keswick and Kendal via Ambleside.

The Samling Hotel was built in the 1780s, then called the "Dove Nest".

Ambleside & District Golf Club founded in 1903 ended in the late 1950s; Windermere Golf Club is a few miles along the lake's east side.

The Armitt Library and Museum opened in 1912 in memory of Sophia and Mary Louisa Armitt is notable as a resource for history. Its main resident collection overviews Lake District artists and writers with display panels, photographs and copies of their key works, and some originals of minor works.

Landmarks

Bridge House

Bridge House was built over Stock Ghyll more than 300 years ago, probably as a summer house and apple store for Ambleside Hall. It was purchased by local people in 1926 and given to the National Trust. Listed Grade I, the building is now used as an information centre for the National Trust, and is part of the Trust's Windermere and Troutbeck property.

 The building was depicted by the Victorian landscapist Lewis Pinhorn Wood (1848-1918) in his late 19th century work The Cobbler's Shop on the Bridge.

St Mary's Church

A shared Church of England and Methodist church.  Before the 17th century the dead of Ambleside were buried at St Martin's Church, Bowness-on-Windermere,
Ambleside then gained the right to its own registers and had a chapel dedicated to St Anne. This was too small to accommodate the enlarged Anglican congregations as tourism boomed from the Kendal and Windermere Railway opened in 1847.
St Mary's Church was built in the 1850s to a design by George Gilbert Scott in the Gothic Revival style. 
Notable features include:
 the stone spire, an unusual feature in Westmorland churches, 
 the mural depicting rushbearing (a ceremony which is held on the first Saturday in July). The mural was created during World War II when the Royal College of Art was based in Ambleside. 
Early 20th century Vicar, Henry Adamson Thompson, is depicted on the right of the mural. His body and that of his only son, Henry Lionel Francess Thompson – killed in World War II – share the same part of the churchyard.

Other burials include Annie, Sophia and Mary Louisa Armitt.

Mater Amabilis church
The town's many decades-old Catholic Church in a traditional design is a consolidation of two churches; until 2013 nearby Grasmere held services, whose reverend, Kevan Dorgan of Windermere was translated to the consolidated parish. His predecessor, who retired, was David Duanne.

Education

University of Cumbria

The Ambleside campus of the University of Cumbria, formerly St. Martin's College and Charlotte Mason College, is at the northern end of the town; courses held at the campus include Conservation, Forestry, and Outdoor Studies.

On 1 December 2009, it was announced that the Ambleside campus would be 'mothballed' at the end of July 2010, and would no longer take new undergraduate students. The closure was in the face of fierce opposition from the Ambleside students, the townspeople, and support pledged from Tim Farron, MP for the campus and its students.

In July 2011, the university announced a plan to reopen the campus and increase student numbers at the Ambleside campus beginning in 2014. In September 2014, the newly refurbished campus was reopened.

Exploration youth group
Brathay Exploration Group, a youth charity, mainly meets at associated Clappersgate.

Waterhead locality

Waterhead Pier at Waterhead, about one mile south of the town centre, is a boarding point for Windermere Lake Cruises on Windermere. Services run year-round connecting to Bowness-on-Windermere and Lakeside. Between March and October, a second service operates to the Brockhole Lake District Visitor Centre and Wray Castle.

Waterhead has hotels, cafés, boat hire establishments and the YHA youth hostel. It is mostly green buffered from the town, including by copses of mature trees.

Notable residents
William Wordsworth worked in Ambleside, as Distributor of Stamps for Westmorland, from 1813, while living at Rydal Mount in the nearby village of Rydal. This government position induced Shelley to write a sonnet of mild reprimand, To Wordsworth, but it gave an income other than poetry. In 1842, he became the Poet Laureate and resigned his office.

In 1846 Harriet Martineau moved into her new house, “The Knoll,” where she lived until her death in 1876. "Something of a Victorian superstar," she was a professional woman, international correspondent, ran a micro-farm on her property and formed and worked for a Property Association which helped working families in the neighborhood build their own homes. Her winter lectures packed the Methodist Church beside her home.

The author Mairin Mitchell (1895–1986) was born at Ambleside, the daughter of Dr Thomas Houghton Mitchell, a local GP.

Artist Kurt Schwitters was resident for  years until his death in January 1948. Under legislation to lower the risk of well-covered sympathiser spies he was interned in the Isle of Man for 14 months of World War II after fleeing Nazi Germany to Norway which was invaded in 1940; his release to London was secured with A. Dorner of Rhode Island School of Design's attestation and sponsorship.

Locomotive manufacturer Edward Bury (died 1858) and his wife Priscilla Susan.

The poet Dorothy Gurney wrote the words to the popular wedding hymn "O Perfect Love" at Pullwyke near Ambleside.

Eponyms in fiction and music
The Ambleside Alibi (part of series Lake District Mysteries), by Rebecca Tope, Allison & Busby
Album CSI:Ambleside, by Birkenhead-based band Half Man Half Biscuit.

Mountain rescue
The town maintains the Langdale & Ambleside MRT, one of the busiest volunteer mountain rescue teams nationally.

Climate
Ambleside features an oceanic climate, but being within the Lake District it does experience higher annual rainfall than the average for the North-West of England. Parts of the town have been flooded on numerous occasions, with the River Rothay breaking its banks during Storm Desmond in December 2015.

References

External links

 Ambleside Community & Tourist Information
Ambleside information at the National Trust
Ambleside Photographs On the Ambleside, Cumbria website.
 Cumbria County History Trust: Ambleside (nb: provisional research only – see Talk page)
The Windermere Way – a walking route that goes right around the lake.

 
Towns in Cumbria
Former civil parishes in Cumbria
South Lakeland District